Club Deportivo Villanovense was a Spanish football team based in Villanueva de la Serena, in the autonomous community of Extremadura. Founded in 1951, it was dissolved in 1992 and subsequently replaced by CF Villanovense.

Season to season

1 season in Segunda División B
15 seasons in Tercera División

External links
BDFutbol team profile
ArefePedia team profile 

Defunct football clubs in Extremadura
Association football clubs established in 1951
Association football clubs disestablished in 1992
1951 establishments in Spain
1992 disestablishments in Spain